Restaurant Empire is a 2003 business simulation video game created by Trevor Chan. Developed and published by Enlight Software for Microsoft Windows, the player designs, owns and operates a restaurant.

Gameplay

The player controls the kind of cuisine the restaurant serves (American, French, or Italian), what specific food they serve, and the staff. The player has to keep guests happy and make money at the same time.

There is also a sandbox mode which is basically freeform. There are no confines as there are in the storyline mode (regular mode), but there are no challenges either.

Plot

In the game, a global culinary conglomerate, Omnifood, controls over 60% of the world's restaurants and is rapidly growing. The player must compete against Omnifood.

The player takes the role of Armand LeBeouf, a recent graduate from a French culinary school given the opportunity by his uncle to run his own restaurant. Later, the player is given the opportunity to attract investment capital and open more restaurants.

Reception

The game received "generally favorable reviews" according to the review aggregation website Metacritic. It was criticized by a poor soundtrack, blurry textures, and blocky character models, but praised by overall good gameplay.

Sequel

Enlight produced a sequel, Restaurant Empire II. Game publisher Paradox Interactive signed an agreement with Enlight to bring the game to stores in North America. The game's release was delayed over six times; it was finally released on May 26, 2009.

The new game has several new features, including the addition of German cuisine, as well as the city of Munich as a location for the player to expand his restaurant chain.

References

External links

2003 video games
Fictional chefs
Fictional French people
Restaurants in fiction
Windows games
Windows-only games
Business simulation games
Video games about food and drink
Video games developed in China
Single-player video games